Sultan Mahmud Badaruddin II International Airport  is an international airport serving the city of Palembang, South Sumatra and surrounding areas. It is located in the region KM.10 Talang Betutu District. It is named after Sultan Mahmud Badaruddin II (1767–1852), the last Sultan of Palembang.

History 
At least as early as 1937, Palembang was served by a civil airport at Talang Betutu, operating as a Customs Aerodrome equipped with wireless and direction finding equipment, and basic ground facilities. For Allies the airport was known as Palembang P1 (or just P1). The airport was re-built by the Japanese army during the Japanese occupation in 1942–1943. On July 15, 1963, it was a joint airfield for civilian and military purposes. On August 21, 1975, it became the Talang Betutu Civil Airport, and on April 3, 1985, the airport was renamed to Sultan Mahmud Badaruddin II Airport.

Effective April 1, 1991, the airport is officially managed by the Management of Perum Angkasa Pura II. On January 2, 1992 Management Perum Angkasa Pura II changed its status into PT (Persero) Angkasa Pura II.

When South Sumatra Province was chosen as the host of PON XVI in 2004, the government sought to enlarge the capacity of the airport as well as change the status into an international airport. The current terminal building of the airport was inaugurated on September 27, 2005. The airport was expanded again in 2017 to accommodate the 2018 Asian Games.

Development 
After development the airport became an international airport and can accommodate the wide-body aircraft as of September 27, 2005. The development started on September 18, 2003 with a total cost of Rp366, 7 billion from the Japan International Bank Corporation IDR 251,9 billion and matching funds from the state budget amounting to IDR 114,8 billion. The development resulted in an extension of the runway from 300 meters x 60 meters to 3,000 meters x 60 meters, a vehicle parking area of 20,000 meters which can accommodate 1,000 vehicles, a three-floor passenger terminal covering 13,000 square meters which can accommodate 1,250 passengers, equipped aerobridges, cargo terminals, and other support buildings covering an area of 1900 square meters. This development means Sultan Mahmud Badaruddin II International Airport can accommodate Airbus A330, Boeing 747, Boeing 777, and other wide-body aircraft.

The airport was developed once again for 2018 Asian Games, which started in late 2016 and finished by 2017. Passenger capacity of the terminal, which has a capacity of 3.4 million passengers per year, increased to 4 million passengers and check in counters increased to 43. The aircraft parking apron can  accommodate 19 aircraft. The terminal area was expanded from 34,000 square meters to 115,000 square meters. Passenger capacity of the airport will be gradually increase to accommodate 9 million passengers annually.

Airlines and destinations

Passenger

Accidents and incidents 
 October 6, 1937 - The KLM Douglas DC-3, named "Specht" with registration PH-ALS from Palembang to Singapore, crashed immediately after takeoff at Palembang Airport, Netherlands East Indies. Three crew members and one passenger died. The co-pilot and seven passengers survived. A connecting rod in the no.1 engine had failed, causing a fuel fed fire. The pilot cut the fuel flow to the engine, but the aircraft was unable to gain height on one engine. It impacted terrain.
 On September 24, 1975, Garuda Indonesia Flight 150 crashed on approach to Talang Betutu Airport. The accident, which was attributed to poor weather and fog, killed 25 out of 61 passengers plus one person on the ground.

Ground transportation 

Anticipating traffic congestion during the period of 2018 Asian Games, the local government built the Palembang Light Rail Transit, which connects the airport to Jakabaring Sport City. Only some of the stations were opened in time for the games. The remaining stations opened on 18 October 2017.
The Sultan Mahmud Badaruddin II International Airport LRT station serves the airport. The LRT's fare separates passengers riding to and from the airport and those who don't, with the former paying a higher fare of Rp 10,000 while the latter pays Rp 5,000.
 Indralaya-Palembang-Sultan Mahmud Badarudin II Airport toll road, which is now under construction will facilitate access the airport.
 Section 1: Palembang-Pamulutan, 7.75 kilometers length, is opened on October 12, 2017
 Section 2: Pamulutan-KTM S. Rambutan, 4.90 kilometers length, is predicted opened in March 2018
 Section 3: KTM S. Rambutan-Indralaya, 9.28 kilometers length, land acquisition progress 98 percent and constructions progress 83 percent, is predicted opened in December 2017

Notes

References

External links 
 Official Website
 PT Angkasa Pura II Website

Palembang
Airports in South Sumatra